Roy Zimmerman (born October 7, 1957) is an American satirical singer-songwriter and guitarist now based in Northern California.

Biography
A native of Southern California, Roy Zimmerman wrote a series of satirical musical reviews in the 1980s that were produced by the San Jose Repertory Theatre, including YUP! (1984), UP the YUP (1985), and YUP It UP! (1986).  The musicals parodied the excesses of the evolving yuppie culture in Silicon Valley. The songs included "Teen-age Computer Tycoon", "The Bay Area Sprawl", and "I Want to Be in a Pepsi Commercial," which many Bay Area professionals have remembered since their young adult years.

Zimmerman founded the Southern California satirical folk quartet, The Foremen. It performed at the national conventions of both major American political parties in 1996. Continuing as a solo act, Zimmerman explained the philosophy behind writing and performing humorous songs on increasingly political subjects: "There's nothing funny about World Peace. Social Justice never killed at The Comedy Store. If we ever attain a worldwide consciousness of peace and justice, I'll be happily out of a job. But as long as there's poverty, war, bigotry, ignorance, greed, lust and paranoia, I've got a career".

Among the counter-events to the 2004 Republican National Convention in New York City, Zimmerman performed his song, "Chickenhawk." It indicts those who approve of militarism, as long as neither they nor anyone they know has to be directly involved.  His songs have been played regularly on the Dr. Demento radio show.

Zimmerman played in the Rock Beyond Belief concert on March 31, 2012, at North Carolina's Fort Bragg.

Roy Zimmerman lives and works in Marin County, California, with his wife and collaborator, Melanie Harby, and their sons Joe and Sam.

Discography
Comic Sutra (2004)
Security (2004)
Homeland (2004)
Homeland/Security (combined double album, 2004)
Peacenick (2005)
Best of the Foremen (2006)
Faulty Intelligence (2006)
Thanks for the Support (2008)
Real American (2010)
You're Getting Sleepy (2011)
The Faucet's on Fire! (2015)

References

External links
Official website
[ AllMusic Foremen page]
 Roy Zimmerman to sing at Rock Beyond Belief (2011/03/01)

American male comedians
American satirists
1957 births
Living people
Place of birth missing (living people)
People from Marin County, California
Musicians from the San Francisco Bay Area
Singer-songwriters from California
Journalists from California
Comedians from California
Jewish American comedians
Guitarists from California
20th-century American guitarists
20th-century American comedians
21st-century American Jews